This page gathers the results of elections in Lazio.

Regional elections

Latest regional election

In the latest regional election, which took place on 12–13 February 2023, Francesco Rocca was elected President with the support of the centre-right coalition.

List of previous regional elections
1970 Lazio regional election
1975 Lazio regional election
1980 Lazio regional election
1985 Lazio regional election
1990 Lazio regional election
1995 Lazio regional election
2000 Lazio regional election
2005 Lazio regional election
2010 Lazio regional election
2013 Lazio regional election
2018 Lazio regional election

References

 
Politics of Lazio